HMS Sealion was the name of several ships and at least one land base of the Royal Navy.

  - an S-class submarine active during World War II
  - a Porpoise-class submarine of the Cold War period
The Royal Navy's name for RAF Ballykelly, Northern Ireland. The Joint Anti-submarine School was located there along with several Fleet Air Arm units.

Notes

References
 

Royal Navy ship names